During the 2010–11 season Ross County competed in the Scottish First Division, Challenge Cup, Scottish League Cup and the Scottish Cup.

Summary
Ross County finished eighth in the First Division. They won the Challenge Cup, defeating Queen of the South 2–0 in the final, the second round of the League Cup and were eliminated in the fourth round of the Scottish Cup after a replay.

Management
They started season 2010–11 under the management of Derek Adams. On 11 November 2010, Adams resigned to become assistant manager of Hibernian with Craig Brewster becoming caretaker manager. On 25 November 2010, Willie McStay was appointed as manager, however after failing to win a game in his nine games in charge on 13 February 2011, he was sacked by the club. Four days later Jimmy Calderwood was appointed as manager until the end of the season.

Results and fixtures

Scottish First Division

Scottish Challenge Cup

Scottish League Cup

Scottish Cup

League table

See also
 List of Ross County F.C. seasons

References

Ross County
2010andndash;11